was a town located in Yamagata District, Hiroshima Prefecture, Japan.

As of 2003, the town had an estimated population of 10,594 and a density of 61.93 persons per km². The total area was 171.07 km².

On February 1, 2005, Chiyoda, along with the towns of Geihoku, Ōasa and Toyohira (all from Yamagata District), was merged to create the town of Kitahiroshima.

External links
 Chiyoda official website of Kitahiroshima 

Dissolved municipalities of Hiroshima Prefecture